Hydraena is a genus of minute moss beetles in the family Hydraenidae. There are more than 990 described species in Hydraena.

See also
 List of Hydraena species

References

Further reading

External links

 

Staphylinoidea
Articles created by Qbugbot